Arachne is a figure in Greek mythology. It may also refer to:
 Arachne (Internet suite)
 Arachne (archaeological database)
 407 Arachne, an asteroid
 Julia Carpenter, a fictional superheroine also called Arachne
 A group of characters in Sonic the Hedgehog (comic series)
 A character in Soul Eater, a manga series
 Sarah Hayes (crossword compiler), who uses the pseudonym Arachne.